The Martin XB-51 was an American  trijet ground-attack aircraft. It was designed in 1945 and made its maiden flight in 1949. The "A" ground-attack classification was eliminated the next year, and the XB-51 designation was assigned instead. The requirement was for low-level bombing and close support. The XB-51 lost out in evaluation to the English Electric Canberra which - built by Martin - entered service as the Martin B-57 Canberra.

Design and development

This unorthodox design, first flying on 28 October 1949, was fitted with three General Electric J47 engines - an unusual number for a combat aircraft - two underneath the forward fuselage in pods, and one at the extreme tail with the intake at the base of the tailfin. The innovative, variable incidence wings, swept at 35° and with 6° anhedral, were equipped with leading edge slats and full-width flaps. Spoilers gave most of the roll control and undersized ailerons provided feel for the pilot. The combination of variable incidence and slotted flaps gave a shorter takeoff run. Four 954 lb (4.24 kN) thrust Rocket-Assisted Take Off (RATO) bottles with a 14-second burn duration could be fitted to the rear fuselage to improve takeoff performance. Spectacular launches were a feature of later test flights.

The main landing gear consisted of dual wheel sets in tandem in the fuselage, similar to the Boeing B-47 Stratojet, with outrigger wheels at the wingtips (originally proved on a modified Martin B-26 Marauder named "Middle River Stump Jumper"). The XB-51 was a large but aerodynamically "clean" design which incorporated nearly all major systems internally.   The aircraft was fitted with a rotating bomb bay, a Martin trademark; bombs could also be carried externally up to a maximum load of 10,400 lb (4,700 kg), although the specified basic mission required only a 4,000 lb (1,814 kg) bombload. Eight 20 mm cannon mounted in the nose would have been installed in production aircraft.

Crew was a pilot under a "fighter"-type bubble canopy and a Short-range navigation and bombing system (SHORAN) operator/navigator in a compartment located lower than and to the rear of the cockpit (only a small observation window was provided). Both crew members were provided with a pressurized, air conditioned environment, equipped with upward-firing ejection seats. The XB-51 was the first Martin aircraft equipped with ejection seats, these being of their own design.

Operational history

In 1950, the United States Air Force issued a new requirement based on early Korean war experience for a night intruder/bomber to replace the Douglas A-26 Invader. The XB-51 was entered, as well as the Avro Canada CF-100 and English Electric Canberra; the XB-51 and Canberra emerged from these as the favorites.

Test flights showed the XB-51 to be highly maneuverable at low altitudes and substantially faster than the Canberra and faster than most fighter aircraft of the era. However, the XB-51's endurance was significantly lower than that of the Canberra and this factor was decisive in its cancellation. In addition, a load limiting factor of only 3.67 g (36 m/s2) meant that the general strength of the airframe was relatively low and would prevent tight turns while fully loaded. Additionally, the tandem main gear plus outriggers of the XB-51 were thought unsuitable for the requirement to fly from emergency forward airfields.

While the XB-51 was not selected for procurement, it was decided that Martin would build 250 Canberras under license, under the designation B-57. Furthermore, Martin's rotating bomb bay would be incorporated into production variants of the B-57. A "Super Canberra", incorporating other XB-51 features, such as swept wings and tail-planes, was also proposed. This aircraft – although it promised much better speed and performance than the B-57 – never reached the prototype stage, mainly because the many changes would have taken too long to implement and test, before it could be put into production.

Flights by the XB-51 prototype, 46-685, continued, for general research purposes, following the project's official cancellation by the USAF. A second prototype, 46-686, which first flew in 1950, crashed during low-level aerobatics on 9 May 1952, killing pilot Major Neil H. Lathrop. 46-685  continued to fly, including an appearance in the film Toward the Unknown as the "Gilbert XF-120" fighter. The surviving prototype was en- route to Eglin AFB to shoot additional footage when it crashed during takeoff, following a refueling stop in El Paso, Texas, on 25 March 1956.

Specifications (XB-51)

See also

References

Notes

Bibliography

 Andrade, John M. U.S. Military Aircraft Designations and Serials since 1909. Earl Shilton, Leicester, UK: Midland Counties Publications, 1979. .
 Boyne, Walter. "Attack, The Story of the XB-51, Martin's Phantom Strike Ship!" Airpower, Volume 8, No. 4, July 1978.
 Jones, Lloyd S. U.S. Bombers, B-1 1928 to B-1 1980s. Fallbrook, California: Aero Publishers, 1962, second edition 1974. .
 Mikesh, Robert C. 'B-57 Canberra At War 1964-1972. London: Ian Allan, 1980. .
 Winchester, Jim. "Martin XB-51." Concept Aircraft: Prototypes, X-Planes and Experimental Aircraft. Kent, UK: Grange Books plc., 2005. .

External links

 USAF Museum: XB-51
 Several photographs of the Martin 234 XB-51 46-685
 

B-51
Trijets
B-51, Martin
Variable-incidence-wing aircraft
T-tail aircraft
Aircraft first flown in 1949
Mid-wing aircraft